İkizbağlar or Tom is a village in the Tillo District of Siirt Province in Turkey. The village is populated by Arabs and had a population of 496 in 2021.

References 

Villages in Tillo District
Arab settlements in Siirt Province